Stradonice may refer to:
 
4824 Stradonice, an asteroid
Stradonice (Kladno District), a municipality and village in the Czech Republic
Stradonice, a village and part of Nižbor in the Czech Republic